The 2020 Hard To Kill was a professional wrestling pay-per-view (PPV) event produced by Impact Wrestling. It took place on January 12, 2020, in Dallas, Texas. It was the inaugural event under the Hard To Kill chronology.

Nine matches were contested at the event. In the main event, Tessa Blanchard defeated Sami Callihan in an intergender match to win the Impact World Championship, becoming the first female world champion in Impact history.

Production

Background
At Bound for Glory, Impact Wrestling announced Hard To Kill would take place in January 2020, however no specific date or location was announced. It was later announced to take place on January 12, 2020, in Dallas, Texas.

Storylines 
The event featured professional wrestling matches that involved different wrestlers from pre-existing scripted feuds and storylines. Wrestlers portrayed villains, heroes, or less distinguishable characters in scripted events that built tension and culminated in a wrestling match or series of matches. 

Rich Swann was originally going to compete against the North with his partner Willie Mack, but he suffered an ankle injury two nights before at Bash at the Brewery 2. Doctors decided to not allow him to compete. Brian Cage also suffered a torn bicep in the weeks leading up to the show and was also unable to compete in an official match. Daga took his place to wrestle Rob Van Dam.

Results

See also
2020 in professional wrestling

References

External links
impactwrestling.com

Impact Wrestling Hard To Kill
2020 Impact Wrestling pay-per-view events
2020 in Texas
Events in Dallas
January 2020 events in the United States
Professional wrestling in the Dallas–Fort Worth metroplex